The men's 200 metres event at the 1987 Pan American Games was held in Indianapolis, United States on 12, 13 and 15 August.

Medalists

Results

Heats

Wind:Heat 1: -0.5 m/s, Heat 2: -1.1 m/s, Heat 3: -0.8 m/s

Semifinals

Wind:Heat 1: -1.0 m/s, Heat 2: -1.2 m/s

Final
Wind: +1.3 m/s

References

Athletics at the 1987 Pan American Games
1987